Pro Duta Football Club played in Indonesian Premier League in 2013.  This season is the first time for Pro Duta FC to compete in the top level of Indonesia's professional league. Their homebase is in Teladan, Medan.

Players

First team squad 2013

Youth team squad

Friendly Matches

Pro Duta FC Dare To Dream Tour 2013

Competitions

Indonesia Premier League

Fixtures and Result

IPL 2013
IPL 2013 Putaran I

IPL 2013 Putaran II

League table

IPL 2013 Playoff
Group K: Matches

Group K: Playoff League Table

Final Stage

Piala Indonesia

External links
 The Official Website of Pro Duta FC
 The Official Website of Indonesian Premier League

References

Pro Duta seasons
Indonesian football clubs 2013 season